Jack Murphy (born in Boston, Massachusetts) is a professional lacrosse player with the Boston Cannons of Major League Lacrosse. He was the 2015 ECAC Goalkeeper of the Year while playing for Fairfield University.

High school
Murphy attended Cohasset High School where earned four varsity letters. He earned US Lacrosse All-America accolades during his senior season after stopping 248 shots and posting a 4.04 goals against average (GAA).

College
Murphy initially attended Mass Maritime where he started 15 times as freshman, earned Second-Team All-Pilgrim League honors, and was named NCAA Academic All-America.  He stopped over 57 percent of the shots he faced and posted an 11.09 GAA for the season.

Murphy then transferred to Fairfield University where he eventually finished ranked fifth all-time for saves (321). As a senior captain, Murphy was ranked seventh nationally for goals against average (8.35) and was named an USILA North/South All-Star, NEILA East/West All-Star, ECAC Goalkeeper of the Year, ECAC All-First Team, and the ECAC Championship All-Tournament Team.

Professional
Murphy was selected in the 8th round of the 2014 MLL Collegiate Draft by the Boston Cannons. In 2017, Murphy became the starting goalie for Boston Cannons.

References

External links
Boston Cannons profile
Fairfield Stags profile

Major League Lacrosse players
Living people
American lacrosse players
Fairfield Stags men's lacrosse players
Boston Cannons players
People from Cohasset, Massachusetts
Year of birth missing (living people)
Cohasset High School alumni